Lincoln is a town in Providence County, Rhode Island, United States. The population was 22,529 at the 2020 census. Lincoln is located in northeastern Rhode Island, north of Providence. Lincoln is part of the Providence metropolitan statistical area and the Greater Boston combined statistical area.

Lincoln was settled in the 17th century as part of the Louisquisset grant, and several colonial stone-enders still exist in the town. Lincoln Woods State Park is located within the town.

Limestone quarrying has occurred there since colonial times at the village of Lime Rock. Lincoln was a part of the town of Smithfield until 1871, when it was split off and named in honor of Abraham Lincoln. Lincoln became an important mill town in the late 19th century, with many textile factories running along the Blackstone River. Lincoln's villages include Manville, Albion, Lime Rock, Lonsdale, Fairlawn, Quinnville, and Saylesville.

In 2008, the town was ranked #63 in Money Magazine's "Best Places to Live".

Lincoln is in the lower Blackstone Valley of Rhode Island and in the John H. Chafee, Blackstone River Valley National Heritage Corridor, New England's historic National Park area.

Geography

Lincoln is home to Lincoln Woods State Park and Bally's Twin River Lincoln Casino Resort (formerly a racetrack known as Lincoln Downs and Lincoln Park).

Demographics

As of the census of 2000, there were 20,898 people, 8,243 households, and 5,778 families residing in the town. The racial makeup of the town was 95.55% White, 0.84% African American, 0.08% Native American, 1.75% Asian, 0.01% Pacific Islander, 0.64% from other races, and 1.13% from two or more races. Hispanic or Latino of any race were 1.64% of the population.
There were 8,243 households, out of which 32.6% had children under the age of 18 living with them, 56.8% were married couples living together, 10.2% had a female householder with no husband present, and 29.9% were non-families. 25.9% of all households were made up of individuals, and 12.1% had someone living alone who was 65 years of age or older.  The average household size was 2.51 and the average family size was 3.05.

In the town, the population was spread out, with 24.7% under the age of 18, 5.9% from 18 to 24, 28.8% from 25 to 44, 24.1% from 45 to 64, and 16.5% who were 65 years of age or older.  The median age was 40 years. For every 100 females, there were 90.8 males.  For every 100 females age 18 and over, there were 85.9 males.

The median income for a household in the town was $88,171, and the median income for a family was $61,257. Males had a median income of $41,508 versus $30,089 for females. The per capita income for the town was $26,779.  About 3.9% of families and 5.2% of the population were below the poverty line, including 6.2% of those under age 18 and 7.3% of those age 65 or over.

National Historic Register sites 

 Albion Historic District
 Eleazer Arnold House
 Israel Arnold House
 Ballou House
 Elliot-Harris-Miner House
 Great Road Historic District
 Hearthside
 Jenckes House, Jenckes Hill Road
 Jenckes House, Old Louisquisset Pike
 Lime Kilns
 Limerock Village Historic District
 Old Ashton Historic District
 Pullen Corner School
 Sassafras Site, RI-55
 Saylesville Historic District
 Saylesville Meetinghouse
 Whipple-Cullen House and Barn

Economy and infrastructure

Education

Lincoln School Department has three early learning centers (Pre-K) at Lonsdale, Central, and Northern Elementary. In total there are four elementary schools (Full day K–5): Saylesville Elementary School, Lonsdale Elementary School, Central Elementary School, and Northern Lincoln Elementary School. Lincoln has one Middle School, and one high school, Lincoln Senior High School. Their mascot is a lion. At one point, the middle and high school shared one campus, but in 2006 a new middle school was opened on Jenckes Hill Road. The high school, in desperate need of additional classrooms, expanded into the former middle school area. The Community College of Rhode Island's Flanagan Campus is situated in Lincoln.

Healthcare
Lincoln is home to the Quality Assurance Review Center (QARC), which performs thousands of radiotherapy reviews per year. QARC's primary support comes from federal grants at the National Cancer Institute (NCI) and contracts with the pharmaceutical industry. It receives radiotherapy data from approximately 1,000 hospitals in both the United States and abroad. The center maintains a strategic affiliation with the University of Massachusetts Medical School in Worcester, Massachusetts, and is located along the George Washington Highway.

Business
Lincoln is also home to the Amica Mutual Insurance Company. Founded in 1907, it moved to Lincoln in 1994, after first being located in both Boston and Providence. The company mostly underwrites policies for property and casualty insurance, which includes automobiles, homeowners, and personal liabilities.

Beacon Design by Chemart was founded in 1976 in Lincoln, RI. Beacon Design by ChemArt is a U.S. wholesale manufacturer and the industry leader in metal-etched keepsakes. ChemArt is split into two divisions, Beacon Design and ChemTec. Beacon Design consists of the custom and retail ornaments and keepsakes, while ChemTec serves the company's industrial sector. The company helps create custom pieces for organizations and companies alike, with their in house design team and salespeople, they're able to make changes, assist the customer, and produce the piece all in Lincoln, RI.

Notable people

 Eddie Dowling (1889–1976), Actor, Singer, Composer
 Hank Gilpin (born 1946), furniture maker and wood sculptor
 Kristin Hayter (born 1986), Neoclassical dark wave musician
 Clem Labine (1926–2007), Major League Baseball pitcher
 Sarah MacLean (born 1978), New York Times Bestselling Author
 Chet Nichols Jr. (1931–1995), baseball player
 David Olney (1948–2020), Americana singer/songwriter

References

External links

 
 Town of Lincoln
 Lincoln Public Schools website
 http://www.lincolnri.com/government/elected/council.php

 
Towns in Providence County, Rhode Island
Providence metropolitan area
Towns in Rhode Island